Andrew Fisher (born 17 November 1967) is a former professional rugby league footballer who played in the 1980s, 1990s and 2000s, and coached in the 2000s.

Playing career

County Cup Final appearances
Andy Fisher played as an interchange/substitute, i.e. number 15, (replacing  Glen Booth) in Featherstone Rovers' 14-20 defeat by Bradford Northern in the 1989 Yorkshire County Cup Final during the 1989–90 season at Headingley Rugby Stadium, Leeds on Sunday 5 November 1989.

First Division Grand Final appearances
Andy Fisher was an interchange/substitute in Wakefield Trinity's 24-22 victory over Featherstone Rovers in the 1998 First Division Grand Final at McAlpine Stadium, Huddersfield on Saturday 26 September 1998.

Financial crisis at Wakefield Trinity Wildcats
In 2000, at the height of a financial crisis at Wakefield Trinity Wildcats, the contracts of all players aged over 24 were terminated during September 2000. The players affected were; Andy Fisher, Bobbie Goulding, Warren Jowitt, Tony Kemp (player-coach), Steve McNamara, Francis Maloney, Martin Masella, Steve Prescott, Bright Sodje, Francis Stephenson, and Glen Tomlinson.

Club career
Andy Fisher made his début for Featherstone Rovers on Sunday 3 September 1989.

References

External links
 (archived by web.archive.org) Fisher quits Dragons
2001 Super League Team-by-team guide
Goodway calls for aid package
Wakefield coach resigns
Kelly handed Dewsbury post
Search for "Andy Fisher" at bbc.co.uk

1967 births
Living people
Barrow Raiders players
Castleford Tigers players
Dewsbury Rams coaches
Dewsbury Rams players
English rugby league players
Featherstone Rovers players
Hull F.C. players
Place of birth missing (living people)
Rugby league coaches
Rugby league props
Rugby league second-rows
Wakefield Trinity players